The Mixed 10 m platform synchro competition of the 2022 European Aquatics Championships was held on 17 August 2022.

Results
The final started at 13:50.

References

Diving
European Aquatics Championships